Seyed Mohammad Marandi (born 1966 in Richmond, Virginia) is an Iranian American academic and political analyst. He is the son of Alireza Marandi, a physician who has served in Iran's government as Minister of Health as well as a Member of Parliament.

Early life and education 
Seyed Mohammad Marandi was born in Richmond, Virginia and spent the first 13 years of his life in the United States. Following his return to Iran, he volunteered to fight in the Iran-Iraq war and survived two chemical weapons attacks.

Marandi is a graduate of the University of Tehran and Birmingham University (UK), where his PhD thesis was entitled "Lord Byron, his critics and Orientalism", described as a "response to Edward Said's Orientalism".

Career 
Marandi was the head of the North American Studies program at the University of Tehran; he is currently a professor of English Literature and Orientalism at the university.

Marandi has appeared as a political and social commentator on international news networks such as PBS, ABC, CGTN, CNN, BBC, Al Jazeera, and RT. He has also contributed opinion pieces to publications such as Al Jazeera, Middle East Eye, and Tehran Times.

He is an adviser to the Iranian nuclear negotiations team in Vienna.

Following the 2022 stabbing of Salman Rushdie, Marandi wrote "I won't be shedding tears for a writer who spouts endless hatred & contempt for Muslims & Islam." Marandi also alluded to a conspiracy theory suggesting that the action reflected an attempt by Iran's enemies to harm its image, writing "is it a coincidence that just when we are on the verge of revitalising the nuclear agreement, America makes claims about an attempted assassination of Bolton and then this happens?" Marandi's statement referenced the United States Department of Justice's allegation that Iran had planned to assassinate US national security advisor John Bolton in 2020.

Controversy 
A day after the August 2022 knife attack on author Salman Rushdie, Marandi wrote on Twitter: "I won't be shedding tears for a writer who spouts endless hatred and contempt for Muslims and Islam." The Arab Center Washington DC called the remark "troubling".

Written works 

"Oppressors and Oppressed Reconsidered: A Shi‘itologic Perspective on the Islamic Republic of Iran and Hezbollah’s Outlook on International Relations" (with Raffaele Mauriello) in Islam and International Relations: Contributions to Theory and Practice, Springer, 2015, pp. 50–71.
"The Khamenei Doctrine: Iran’s leader on diplomacy, foreign policy and international relations" (with Raffaele Mauriello) in Islam in International Relations: Politics and Paradigms, Routledge, 2018, pp. 18–38.

Sources 

1966 births
Living people
American people of Iranian descent
Academic staff of the University of Tehran
Academic staff of the Faculty of World Studies
University of Tehran alumni
Alumni of the University of Birmingham
People from Richmond, Virginia
Political commentators